This is a list of the bird species recorded in Sudan. The avifauna of Sudan include a total of 633 species.

This list's taxonomic treatment (designation and sequence of orders, families and species) and nomenclature (common and scientific names) follow the conventions of The Clements Checklist of Birds of the World, 20212 edition. The family accounts at the beginning of each heading reflect this taxonomy, as do the species counts found in each family account. Introduced and accidental species are included in the total counts for Sudan.

The following tags have been used to highlight several categories, but not all species fall into one of these categories. Those that do not are commonly occurring native species.

(A) Accidental - a species that rarely or accidentally occurs in Sudan
(E) Endemic - a species endemic to Sudan
(I) Introduced - a species introduced to Sudan as a consequence, direct or indirect, of human actions

Ostriches
Order: StruthioniformesFamily: Struthionidae

The ostrich is a flightless bird native to Africa. It is the largest living species of bird. It is distinctive in its appearance, with a long neck and legs and the ability to run at high speeds.

Common ostrich, Struthio camelus

Ducks, geese, and waterfowl
Order: AnseriformesFamily: Anatidae

Anatidae includes the ducks and most duck-like waterfowl, such as geese and swans. These birds are adapted to an aquatic existence with webbed feet, flattened bills, and feathers that are excellent at shedding water due to an oily coating.

White-faced whistling-duck, Dendrocygna viduata
Fulvous whistling-duck, Dendrocygna bicolor
White-backed duck, Thalassornis leuconotus (A)
Greater white-fronted goose, Anser albifrons (A)
Knob-billed duck, Sarkidiornis melanotos
Egyptian goose, Alopochen aegyptiacus
Ruddy shelduck, Tadorna ferruginea
Common shelduck, Tadorna tadorna (A)
Spur-winged goose, Plectropterus gambensis
Garganey, Spatula querquedula
Blue-billed teal, Spatula hottentota
Northern shoveler, Spatula clypeata
Gadwall, Mareca strepera (A)
Eurasian wigeon, Mareca penelope
Mallard, Anas platyrhynchos (A)
Cape teal, Anas capensis
Red-billed duck, Anas erythrorhyncha (A)
Northern pintail, Anas acuta
Green-winged teal, Anas crecca
Southern pochard, Netta erythrophthalma (A)
Common pochard, Aythya ferina
Ferruginous duck, Aythya nyroca
Tufted duck, Aythya fuligula

Guineafowl
Order: GalliformesFamily: Numididae

Guineafowl are a group of African, seed-eating, ground-nesting birds that resemble partridges, but with featherless heads and spangled grey plumage.

Helmeted guineafowl, Numida meleagris
Western crested guineafowl, Guttera verreauxi

New World quail
Order: GalliformesFamily: Odontophoridae

Despite their family's common name, this species and one other are native to Africa.

Stone partridge, Ptilopachus petrosus

Pheasants, grouse, and allies
Order: GalliformesFamily: Phasianidae

The Phasianidae are a family of terrestrial birds which consists of quails, partridges, snowcocks, francolins, spurfowls, tragopans, monals, pheasants, peafowls and jungle fowls. In general, they are plump (although they vary in size) and have broad, relatively short wings.

Sand partridge, Ammoperdix heyi
Common quail, Coturnix coturnix
Harlequin quail, Coturnix delegorguei
Erckel's francolin, Pternistis erckelii
Clapperton's francolin, Pternistis clappertoni

Flamingos
Order: PhoenicopteriformesFamily: Phoenicopteridae

Flamingos filter-feed on shellfish and algae. Their oddly shaped beaks are specially adapted to separate mud and silt from the food they consume and, uniquely, are used upside-down.

Greater flamingo, Phoenicopterus roseus

Grebes
Order: PodicipediformesFamily: Podicipedidae

Grebes are small to medium-large freshwater diving birds. They have lobed toes and are excellent swimmers and divers. However, they have their feet placed far back on the body, making them quite ungainly on land.

Little grebe, Tachybaptus ruficollis
Eared grebe, Podiceps nigricollis (A)

Pigeons and doves
Order: ColumbiformesFamily: Columbidae

Pigeons and doves are stout-bodied birds with short necks and short slender bills with a fleshy cere.

Rock pigeon, Columba livia
Speckled pigeon, Columba guinea
European turtle-dove, Streptopelia turtur
African collared-dove, Streptopelia roseogrisea
Mourning collared-dove, Streptopelia decipiens
Red-eyed dove, Streptopelia semitorquata
Ring-necked dove, Streptopelia capicola
Vinaceous dove, Streptopelia vinacea
Laughing dove, Streptopelia senegalensis
Emerald-spotted wood-dove, Turtur chalcospilos (A)
Black-billed wood-dove, Turtur abyssinicus
Namaqua dove, Oena capensis
Bruce's green-pigeon, Treron waalia

Sandgrouse
Order: PterocliformesFamily: Pteroclidae

Sandgrouse have small, pigeon like heads and necks, but sturdy compact bodies. They have long pointed wings and sometimes tails and a fast direct flight. Flocks fly to watering holes at dawn and dusk. Their legs are feathered down to the toes.

Chestnut-bellied sandgrouse, Pterocles exustus
Spotted sandgrouse, Pterocles senegallus
Crowned sandgrouse, Pterocles coronatus (A)
Lichtenstein's sandgrouse, Pterocles lichtensteinii
Four-banded sandgrouse, Pterocles quadricinctus

Bustards
Order: OtidiformesFamily: Otididae

Bustards are large terrestrial birds mainly associated with dry open country and steppes in the Old World. They are omnivorous and nest on the ground. They walk steadily on strong legs and big toes, pecking for food as they go. They have long broad wings with "fingered" wingtips and striking patterns in flight. Many have interesting mating displays.

Arabian bustard, Ardeotis arabs
Kori bustard, Ardeotis kori (A)
MacQueen's bustard, Chlamydotis macqueenii (A)
Denham's bustard, Neotis denhami (A)
Nubian bustard, Neotis nuba (A)
White-bellied bustard, Eupodotis senegalensis
Savile's bustard, Lophotis savilei
Black-bellied bustard, Lissotis melanogaster
Hartlaub's bustard, Lissotis hartlaubii (A)

Turacos
Order: MusophagiformesFamily: Musophagidae

The turacos, plantain eaters and go-away-birds make up the bird family Musophagidae. They are medium-sized arboreal birds. The turacos and plantain eaters are brightly coloured, usually in blue, green or purple. The go-away-birds are mostly grey and white.

White-bellied go-away-bird, Corythaixoides leucogaster (A)
Eastern plantain-eater, Crinifer zonurus

Cuckoos
Order: CuculiformesFamily: Cuculidae

The family Cuculidae includes cuckoos, roadrunners, and anis. These birds are of variable size with slender bodies, long tails and strong legs. The Old World cuckoos are brood parasites.

Senegal coucal, Centropus senegalensis (A)
Blue-headed coucal, Centropus monachus
White-browed coucal, Centropus superciliosus
Great spotted cuckoo, Clamator glandarius
Levaillant's cuckoo, Clamator levaillantii
Pied cuckoo, Clamator jacobinus
Dideric cuckoo, Chrysococcyx caprius
Klaas's cuckoo, Chrysococcyx klaas
Black cuckoo, Cuculus clamosus
Red-chested cuckoo, Cuculus solitarius
African cuckoo, Cuculus gularis (A)
Common cuckoo, Cuculus canorus

Nightjars and allies
Order: CaprimulgiformesFamily: Caprimulgidae

Nightjars are medium-sized nocturnal birds that usually nest on the ground. They have long wings, short legs and very short bills. Most have small feet, of little use for walking, and long pointed wings. Their soft plumage is camouflaged to resemble bark or leaves.

Pennant-winged nightjar, Caprimulgus vexillarius
Standard-winged nightjar, Caprimulgus longipennis
Eurasian nightjar, Caprimulgus europaeus
Rufous-cheeked nightjar, Caprimulgus rufigena (A)
Egyptian nightjar, Caprimulgus aegyptius
Nubian nightjar, Caprimulgus nubicus
Golden nightjar, Caprimulgus eximius
Plain nightjar, Caprimulgus inornatus
Freckled nightjar, Caprimulgus tristigma (A)
Long-tailed nightjar, Caprimulgus climacurus

Swifts
Order: CaprimulgiformesFamily: Apodidae

Swifts are small birds which spend the majority of their lives flying. These birds have very short legs and never settle voluntarily on the ground, perching instead only on vertical surfaces. Many swifts have long swept-back wings which resemble a crescent or boomerang.

Alpine swift, Apus melba
Mottled swift, Apus aequatorialis
Common swift, Apus apus
Pallid swift, Apus pallidus
Little swift, Apus affinis
Horus swift, Apus horus (A)
White-rumped swift, Apus caffer
African palm-swift, Cypsiurus parvus

Rails, gallinules, and coots
Order: GruiformesFamily: Rallidae

Rallidae is a large family of small to medium-sized birds which includes the rails, crakes, coots and gallinules. Typically they inhabit dense vegetation in damp environments near lakes, swamps or rivers. In general they are shy and secretive birds, making them difficult to observe. Most species have strong legs and long toes which are well adapted to soft uneven surfaces. They tend to have short, rounded wings and to be weak fliers.

Corn crake, Crex crex
African crake, Crex egregia (A)
Spotted crake, Porzana porzana
Lesser moorhen, Paragallinula angulata (A)
Eurasian moorhen, Gallinula chloropus
Eurasian coot, Fulica atra
Allen's gallinule, Porphyrio alleni
African swamphen, Porphyrio madagascariensis (A)
Black crake, Zapornia flavirostris
Little crake, Zapornia parva
Baillon's crake, Zapornia pusilla

Cranes
Order: GruiformesFamily: Gruidae

Cranes are large, long-legged and long-necked birds. Unlike the similar-looking but unrelated herons, cranes fly with necks outstretched, not pulled back. Most have elaborate and noisy courting displays or "dances".

Black crowned-crane, Balearica pavonina
Demoiselle crane, Anthropoides virgo
Common crane, Grus grus

Thick-knees
Order: CharadriiformesFamily: Burhinidae

The thick-knees are a group of largely tropical waders in the family Burhinidae. They are found worldwide within the tropical zone, with some species also breeding in temperate Europe and Australia. They are medium to large waders with strong black or yellow-black bills, large yellow eyes and cryptic plumage. Despite being classed as waders, most species have a preference for arid or semi-arid habitats.

Eurasian stone-curlew, Burhinus oedicnemus
Senegal thick-knee, Burhinus senegalensis
Spotted thick-knee, Burhinus capensis

Egyptian plover
Order: CharadriiformesFamily: Pluvianidae

The Egyptian plover is found across equatorial Africa and along the Nile River.

Egyptian plover, Pluvianus aegyptius

Stilts and avocets
Order: CharadriiformesFamily: Recurvirostridae

Recurvirostridae is a family of large wading birds, which includes the avocets and stilts. The avocets have long legs and long up-curved bills. The stilts have extremely long legs and long, thin, straight bills.

Black-winged stilt, Himantopus himantopus
Pied avocet, Recurvirostra avosetta

Oystercatchers
Order: CharadriiformesFamily: Haematopodidae

The oystercatchers are large and noisy plover-like birds, with strong bills used for smashing or prising open molluscs.

Eurasian oystercatcher, Haematopus ostralegus

Plovers and lapwings
Order: CharadriiformesFamily: Charadriidae

The family Charadriidae includes the plovers, dotterels and lapwings. They are small to medium-sized birds with compact bodies, short, thick necks and long, usually pointed, wings. They are found in open country worldwide, mostly in habitats near water.

Black-bellied plover, Pluvialis squatarola
Pacific golden-plover, Pluvialis fulva
Northern lapwing, Vanellus vanellus (A)
Long-toed lapwing, Vanellus crassirostris (A)
Spur-winged plover, Vanellus spinosus
Black-headed lapwing, Vanellus tectus
Wattled lapwing, Vanellus senegallus
Sociable lapwing, Vanellus gregarius
White-tailed lapwing, Vanellus leucurus
Lesser sand-plover, Charadrius mongolus
Greater sand-plover, Charadrius leschenaultii
Caspian plover, Charadrius asiaticus
Kittlitz's plover, Charadrius pecuarius
Kentish plover, Charadrius alexandrinus (A)
Common ringed plover, Charadrius hiaticula
Little ringed plover, Charadrius dubius
Three-banded plover, Charadrius tricollaris

Painted-snipes
Order: CharadriiformesFamily: Rostratulidae

Painted-snipes are short-legged, long-billed birds similar in shape to the true snipes, but more brightly coloured.

Greater painted-snipe, Rostratula benghalensis (A)

Jacanas
Order: CharadriiformesFamily: Jacanidae

The jacanas are a group of tropical waders in the family Jacanidae. They are found throughout the tropics. They are identifiable by their huge feet and claws which enable them to walk on floating vegetation in the shallow lakes that are their preferred habitat.

Lesser jacana, Microparra capensis (A)
African jacana, Actophilornis africanus

Sandpipers and allies
Order: CharadriiformesFamily: Scolopacidae

Scolopacidae is a large diverse family of small to medium-sized shorebirds including the sandpipers, curlews, godwits, shanks, tattlers, woodcocks, snipes, dowitchers and phalaropes. The majority of these species eat small invertebrates picked out of the mud or soil. Variation in length of legs and bills enables multiple species to feed in the same habitat, particularly on the coast, without direct competition for food.

Whimbrel, Numenius phaeopus
Eurasian curlew, Numenius arquata
Bar-tailed godwit, Limosa lapponica
Black-tailed godwit, Limosa limosa
Ruddy turnstone, Arenaria interpres
Red knot, Calidris canutus (A)
Ruff, Calidris pugnax
Broad-billed sandpiper, Calidris falcinellus (A)
Curlew sandpiper, Calidris ferruginea
Temminck's stint, Calidris temminckii
Sanderling, Calidris alba
Dunlin, Calidris alpina
Little stint, Calidris minuta
Jack snipe, Lymnocryptes minimus
Great snipe, Gallinago media (A)
Common snipe, Gallinago gallinago
Terek sandpiper, Xenus cinereus
Red-necked phalarope, Phalaropus lobatus (A) 
Common sandpiper, Actitis hypoleucos
Green sandpiper, Tringa ochropus
Spotted redshank, Tringa erythropus
Common greenshank, Tringa nebularia
Marsh sandpiper, Tringa stagnatilis
Wood sandpiper, Tringa glareola
Common redshank, Tringa totanus

Buttonquail
Order: CharadriiformesFamily: Turnicidae

The buttonquail are small, drab, running birds which resemble the true quails. The female is the brighter of the sexes and initiates courtship. The male incubates the eggs and tends the young.

Small buttonquail, Turnix sylvatica
Quail-plover, Ortyxelos meiffrenii (A)

Crab-plover
Order: CharadriiformesFamily: Dromadidae

The crab-plover is related to the waders. It resembles a plover but with very long grey legs and a strong heavy black bill similar to a tern. It has black-and-white plumage, a long neck, partially webbed feet and a bill designed for eating crabs.

Crab-plover, Dromas ardeola

Pratincoles and coursers
Order: CharadriiformesFamily: Glareolidae

Glareolidae is a family of wading birds comprising the pratincoles, which have short legs, long pointed wings and long forked tails, and the coursers, which have long legs, short wings and long, pointed bills which curve downwards.

Cream-colored courser, Cursorius cursor
Temminck's courser, Cursorius temminckii (A)
Bronze-winged courser, Rhinoptilus chalcopterus (A)
Collared pratincole, Glareola pratincola
Black-winged pratincole, Glareola nordmanni
Rock pratincole, Glareola nuchalis' (A)

Gulls, terns, and skimmers
Order: CharadriiformesFamily: Laridae

Laridae is a family of medium to large seabirds, the gulls, terns, and skimmers. Gulls are typically grey or white, often with black markings on the head or wings. They have stout, longish bills and webbed feet. Terns are a group of generally medium to large seabirds typically with grey or white plumage, often with black markings on the head. Most terns hunt fish by diving but some pick insects off the surface of fresh water. Terns are generally long-lived birds, with several species known to live in excess of 30 years. Skimmers are a small family of tropical tern-like birds. They have an elongated lower mandible which they use to feed by flying low over the water surface and skimming the water for small fish.

Slender-billed gull, Chroicocephalus geneiGray-hooded gull, Chroicocephalus cirrocephalusBlack-headed gull, Chroicocephalus ridibundusLittle gull, Hydrocoloeus minutus (A)
Mediterranean gull, Ichthyaetus melanocephalus (A)
White-eyed gull, Ichthyaetus leucophthalmusSooty gull, Ichthyaetus hemprichii 
Pallas's gull, Ichthyaetus ichthyaetus (A)
Caspian gull, Larus cachinnansLesser black-backed gull, Larus fuscusBrown noddy, Anous stolidus (A)
Sooty tern, Onychoprion fuscatus (A)
Bridled tern, Onychoprion anaethetusSaunders's tern, Sternula saundersi (A)
Gull-billed tern, Gelochelidon niloticaCaspian tern, Hydroprogne caspiaWhite-winged tern, Chlidonias leucopterusWhiskered tern, Chlidonias hybridusCommon tern, Sterna hirundoArctic tern, Sterna paradisaea (A)
White-cheeked tern, Sterna repressaGreat crested tern, Thalasseus bergiiSandwich tern, Thalasseus sandvicensisLesser crested tern, Thalasseus bengalensisAfrican skimmer, Rynchops flavirostrisTropicbirds
Order: PhaethontiformesFamily: Phaethontidae

Tropicbirds are slender white birds of tropical oceans, with exceptionally long central tail feathers. Their heads and long wings have black markings.

Red-billed tropicbird, Phaethon aethereusNorthern storm-petrels
Order: ProcellariiformesFamily: Hydrobatidae

The northern storm-petrels are relatives of the petrels and are the smallest seabirds. They feed on planktonic crustaceans and small fish picked from the surface, typically while hovering. The flight is fluttering and sometimes bat-like.

Leach's storm-petrel, Hydrobates leucorhous (A)

Storks
Order: CiconiiformesFamily: Ciconiidae

Storks are large, long-legged, long-necked, wading birds with long, stout bills. Storks are mute, but bill-clattering is an important mode of communication at the nest. Their nests can be large and may be reused for many years. Many species are migratory.

African openbill, Anastomus lamelligerusBlack stork, Ciconia nigraAbdim's stork, Ciconia abdimiiAfrican woolly-necked stork, Ciconia microscelisWhite stork, Ciconia ciconiaSaddle-billed stork, Ephippiorhynchus senegalensisMarabou stork, Leptoptilos crumeniferYellow-billed stork, Mycteria ibisBoobies and gannets
Order: SuliformesFamily: Sulidae

The sulids comprise the gannets and boobies. Both groups are medium to large coastal seabirds that plunge-dive for fish.

Brown booby, Sula leucogasterAnhingas
Order: SuliformesFamily: Anhingidae

Anhingas or darters are often called "snake-birds" because of their long thin neck, which gives a snake-like appearance when they swim with their bodies submerged. The males have black and dark-brown plumage, an erectile crest on the nape and a larger bill than the female. The females have much paler plumage especially on the neck and underparts. The darters have completely webbed feet and their legs are short and set far back on the body. Their plumage is somewhat permeable, like that of cormorants, and they spread their wings to dry after diving.

African darter, Anhinga rufaCormorants and shags
Order: SuliformesFamily: Phalacrocoracidae

Phalacrocoracidae is a family of medium to large coastal, fish-eating seabirds that includes cormorants and shags. Plumage colouration varies, with the majority having mainly dark plumage, some species being black-and-white and a few being colourful.

Long-tailed cormorant, Microcarbo africanusGreat cormorant, Phalacrocorax carboPelicans
Order: PelecaniformesFamily: Pelecanidae

Pelicans are large water birds with a distinctive pouch under their beak. As with other members of the order Pelecaniformes, they have webbed feet with four toes.

Great white pelican, Pelecanus onocrotalusPink-backed pelican, Pelecanus rufescensHammerkop
Order: PelecaniformesFamily: Scopidae

The hammerkop is a medium-sized bird with a long shaggy crest. The shape of its head with a curved bill and crest at the back is reminiscent of a hammer, hence its name. Its plumage is drab-brown all over.

Hamerkop, Scopus umbrettaHerons, egrets, and bitterns
Order: PelecaniformesFamily: Ardeidae

The family Ardeidae contains the bitterns, herons and egrets. Herons and egrets are medium to large wading birds with long necks and legs. Bitterns tend to be shorter necked and more wary. Members of Ardeidae fly with their necks retracted, unlike other long-necked birds such as storks, ibises and spoonbills.

Great bittern, Botaurus stellarisLittle bittern, Ixobrychus minutusGray heron, Ardea cinereaBlack-headed heron, Ardea melanocephalaGoliath heron, Ardea goliathPurple heron, Ardea purpureaGreat egret, Ardea albaIntermediate egret, Ardea intermediaLittle egret, Egretta garzettaWestern reef-heron, Egretta gularisBlack heron, Egretta ardesiacaCattle egret, Bubulcus ibisSquacco heron, Ardeola ralloidesStriated heron, Butorides striataBlack-crowned night-heron, Nycticorax nycticoraxWhite-backed night-heron, Gorsachius leuconotusIbises and spoonbills
Order: PelecaniformesFamily: Threskiornithidae

Threskiornithidae is a family of large terrestrial and wading birds which includes the ibises and spoonbills. They have long, broad wings with 11 primary and about 20 secondary feathers. They are strong fliers and despite their size and weight, very capable soarers.

Glossy ibis, Plegadis falcinellusAfrican sacred ibis, Threskiornis aethiopicusNorthern bald ibis, Geronticus eremita (A) 
Hadada ibis, Bostrychia hagedashEurasian spoonbill, Platalea leucorodiaAfrican spoonbill, Platalea albaSecretarybird
Order: AccipitriformesFamily: Sagittariidae

The Secretarybird is a bird of prey in the order Falconiformes but is easily distinguished from other raptors by its long crane-like legs.

Secretarybird, Sagittarius serpentarius (A)

Osprey
Order: AccipitriformesFamily: Pandionidae

The family Pandionidae contains only one species, the osprey. The osprey is a medium-large raptor which is a specialist fish-eater with a worldwide distribution.

Osprey, Pandion haliaetusHawks, eagles, and kites
Order: AccipitriformesFamily: Accipitridae

Accipitridae is a family of birds of prey, which includes hawks, eagles, kites, harriers and Old World vultures. These birds have powerful hooked beaks for tearing flesh from their prey, strong legs, powerful talons and keen eyesight.

Black-winged kite, Elanus caeruleusScissor-tailed kite, Chelictinia riocouriiAfrican harrier-hawk, Polyboroides typusBearded vulture, Gypaetus barbatus (A)
Egyptian vulture, Neophron percnopterusEuropean honey-buzzard, Pernis apivorusOriental honey-buzzard, Pernis ptilorhynchus (A)
White-headed vulture, Trigonoceps occipitalisLappet-faced vulture, Torgos tracheliotosHooded vulture, Necrosyrtes monachusWhite-backed vulture, Gyps africanusRüppell's griffon, Gyps rueppelliEurasian griffon, Gyps fulvusBateleur, Terathopius ecaudatusShort-toed snake-eagle, Circaetus gallicusBeaudouin's snake-eagle, Circaetus beaudouiniBlack-chested snake-eagle, Circaetus pectoralisBrown snake-eagle, Circaetus cinereusBanded snake-eagle, Circaetus cinerascensMartial eagle, Polemaetus bellicosus (A)
Long-crested eagle, Lophaetus occipitalisLesser spotted eagle, Clanga pomarinaGreater spotted eagle, Clanga clangaWahlberg's eagle, Hieraaetus wahlbergiBooted eagle, Hieraaetus pennatusTawny eagle, Aquila rapaxSteppe eagle, Aquila nipalensisImperial eagle, Aquila heliaca (A)
Verreaux's eagle, Aquila verreauxiiAfrican hawk-eagle, Aquila spilogaster (A)
Lizard buzzard, Kaupifalco monogrammicus (A)
Dark chanting-goshawk, Melierax metabatesGabar goshawk, Micronisus gabarGrasshopper buzzard, Butastur rufipennisEurasian marsh-harrier, Circus aeruginosusAfrican marsh-harrier, Circus ranivorus (A)
Hen harrier, Circus cyaneus (A)
Pallid harrier, Circus macrourusMontagu's harrier, Circus pygargusShikra, Accipiter badiusLevant sparrowhawk, Accipiter brevipesLittle sparrowhawk, Accipiter minullus (A)
Eurasian sparrowhawk, Accipiter nisusBlack goshawk, Accipiter melanoleucus (A)
Red kite, Milvus milvus (A)
Black kite, Milvus migransAfrican fish eagle, Haliaeetus vociferCommon buzzard, Buteo buteoLong-legged buzzard, Buteo rufinusRed-necked buzzard, Buteo auguralisAugur buzzard, Buteo augurBarn-owls
Order: StrigiformesFamily: Tytonidae

Barn-owls are medium to large owls with large heads and characteristic heart-shaped faces. They have long strong legs with powerful talons.

Barn owl, Tyto albaOwls
Order: StrigiformesFamily: Strigidae

The typical owls are small to large solitary nocturnal birds of prey. They have large forward-facing eyes and ears, a hawk-like beak and a conspicuous circle of feathers around each eye called a facial disk.

Eurasian scops-owl, Otus scopsAfrican scops-owl, Otus senegalensisNorthern white-faced owl, Ptilopsis leucotisPharaoh eagle-owl, Bubo ascalaphusGrayish eagle-owl, Bubo cinerascensVerreaux's eagle-owl, Bubo lacteusPearl-spotted owlet, Glaucidium perlatumLittle owl, Athene noctuaShort-eared owl, Asio flammeusMousebirds
Order: ColiiformesFamily: Coliidae

The mousebirds are slender greyish or brown birds with soft, hairlike body feathers and very long thin tails. They are arboreal and scurry through the leaves like rodents in search of berries, fruit and buds. They are acrobatic and can feed upside down. All species have strong claws and reversible outer toes. They also have crests and stubby bills.

Speckled mousebird, Colius striatusBlue-naped mousebird, Urocolius macrourusTrogons
Order: TrogoniformesFamily: Trogonidae

The family Trogonidae includes trogons and quetzals. Found in tropical woodlands worldwide, they feed on insects and fruit, and their broad bills and weak legs reflect their diet and arboreal habits. Although their flight is fast, they are reluctant to fly any distance. Trogons have soft, often colourful, feathers with distinctive male and female plumage.

Narina trogon, Apaloderma narinaHoopoes
Order: BucerotiformesFamily: Upupidae

Hoopoes have black, white and orangey-pink colouring with a large erectile crest on their head.

Eurasian hoopoe, Upupa epopsWoodhoopoes and scimitarbills
Order: BucerotiformesFamily: Phoeniculidae

The wood hoopoes are related to the kingfishers, rollers and hoopoes. They most resemble the hoopoes with their long curved bills, used to probe for insects, and short rounded wings. However, they differ in that they have metallic plumage, often blue, green or purple, and lack an erectile crest.

Green woodhoopoe, Phoeniculus purpureusBlack scimitarbill, Rhinopomastus aterrimusGround-hornbills
Order: BucerotiformesFamily: Bucorvidae

The ground-hornbills are terrestrial birds that feed almost entirely on insects, other birds, snakes, and amphibians.

Abyssinian ground-hornbill, Bucorvus abyssinicusHornbills
Order: BucerotiformesFamily: Bucerotidae

Hornbills are a group of birds whose bill is shaped like a cow's horn, but without a twist, sometimes with a casque on the upper mandible. Frequently, the bill is brightly coloured.

African pied hornbill, Lophoceros fasciatusAfrican gray hornbill, Lophoceros nasutusEastern yellow-billed hornbill, Tockus flavirostris (A)
Northern red-billed hornbill, Tockus erythrorhynchusWhite-thighed hornbill, Bycanistes albotibialis (A)

Kingfishers
Order: CoraciiformesFamily: Alcedinidae

Kingfishers are medium-sized birds with large heads, long, pointed bills, short legs and stubby tails.

Common kingfisher, Alcedo atthisHalf-collared kingfisher, Alcedo semitorquataMalachite kingfisher, Corythornis cristatusAfrican pygmy kingfisher, Ispidina pictaGray-headed kingfisher, Halcyon leucocephalaWoodland kingfisher, Halcyon senegalensisStriped kingfisher, Halcyon chelicutiGiant kingfisher, Megaceryle maximusPied kingfisher, Ceryle rudisBee-eaters
Order: CoraciiformesFamily: Meropidae

The bee-eaters are a group of near passerine birds in the family Meropidae. Most species are found in Africa but others occur in southern Europe, Madagascar, Australia and New Guinea. They are characterised by richly coloured plumage, slender bodies and usually elongated central tail feathers. All are colourful and have long downturned bills and pointed wings, which give them a swallow-like appearance when seen from afar.

Red-throated bee-eater, Merops bulockiLittle bee-eater, Merops pusillusEthiopian bee-eater, Merops lafresnayiiWhite-throated bee-eater, Merops albicollisAfrican green bee-eater, Merops viridissimusBlue-cheeked bee-eater, Merops persicusEuropean bee-eater, Merops apiasterNorthern carmine bee-eater, Merops nubicusRollers
Order: CoraciiformesFamily: Coraciidae

Rollers resemble crows in size and build, but are more closely related to the kingfishers and bee-eaters. They share the colourful appearance of those groups with blues and browns predominating. The two inner front toes are connected, but the outer toe is not.

European roller, Coracias garrulusAbyssinian roller, Coracias abyssinicaRufous-crowned roller, Coracias naeviaBroad-billed roller, Eurystomus glaucurusAfrican barbets
Order: PiciformesFamily: Lybiidae

The barbets are plump birds, with short necks and large heads. They get their name from the bristles which fringe their heavy bills. Most species are brightly coloured.

Yellow-breasted barbet, Trachyphonus margaritatusRed-fronted tinkerbird, Pogoniulus pusillus (A)
Yellow-fronted tinkerbird, Pogoniulus chrysoconusVieillot's barbet, Lybius vieillotiBlack-billed barbet, Lybius guifsobalitoBlack-breasted barbet, Lybius rolletiHoneyguides
Order: PiciformesFamily: Indicatoridae

Honeyguides are among the few birds that feed on wax. They are named for the greater honeyguide which leads traditional honey-hunters to bees' nests and, after the hunters have harvested the honey, feeds on the remaining contents of the hive.

Wahlberg's honeyguide, Prodotiscus regulusLesser honeyguide, Indicator minorGreater honeyguide, Indicator indicatorWoodpeckers
Order: PiciformesFamily: Picidae

Woodpeckers are small to medium-sized birds with chisel-like beaks, short legs, stiff tails and long tongues used for capturing insects. Some species have feet with two toes pointing forward and two backward, while several species have only three toes. Many woodpeckers have the habit of tapping noisily on tree trunks with their beaks.

Eurasian wryneck, Jynx torquillaLittle gray woodpecker, Chloropicus elachusBearded woodpecker, Chloropicus namaquusBrown-backed woodpecker, Chloropicus obsoletusAfrican gray woodpecker, Chloropicus goertaeNubian woodpecker, Campethera nubicaFalcons and caracaras
Order: FalconiformesFamily: Falconidae

Falconidae is a family of diurnal birds of prey. They differ from hawks, eagles and kites in that they kill with their beaks instead of their talons.

Lesser kestrel, Falco naumanniEurasian kestrel, Falco tinnunculusFox kestrel, Falco alopexGray kestrel, Falco ardosiaceusRed-necked falcon, Falco chicqueraRed-footed falcon, Falco vespertinusEleonora's falcon, Falco eleonorae (A)
Sooty falcon, Falco concolorMerlin, Falco columbarius (A)
Eurasian hobby, Falco subbuteoAfrican hobby, Falco cuvierii (A)
Lanner falcon, Falco biarmicusSaker falcon, Falco cherrugPeregrine falcon, Falco peregrinusOld World parrots
Order: PsittaciformesFamily: Psittaculidae

Characteristic features of parrots include a strong curved bill, an upright stance, strong legs, and clawed zygodactyl feet. Many parrots are vividly colored, and some are multi-colored. Old World parrots are found from Africa east across south and southeast Asia and Oceania to Australia and New Zealand.

Rose-ringed parakeet, Psittacula krameriAfrican and New World parrots
Order: PsittaciformesFamily: Psittacidae

Most of the more than 150 species in this family are found in the New World.

Meyer's parrot, Poicephalus meyeriCuckooshrikes
Order: PasseriformesFamily: Campephagidae

The cuckooshrikes are small to medium-sized passerine birds. They are predominantly greyish with white and black, although some species are brightly coloured.

White-breasted cuckooshrike, Coracina pectoralisRed-shouldered cuckooshrike, Campephaga phoeniceaOld World orioles
Order: PasseriformesFamily: Oriolidae

The Old World orioles are colourful passerine birds. They are not related to the New World orioles.

Eurasian golden oriole, Oriolus oriolusAfrican golden oriole, Oriolus auratusWattle-eyes and batises
Order: PasseriformesFamily: Platysteiridae

The wattle-eyes, or puffback flycatchers, are small stout passerine birds of the African tropics. They get their name from the brightly coloured fleshy eye decorations found in most species in this group.

Gray-headed batis, Batis orientalisWestern black-headed batis, Batis erlangeriVangas, helmetshrikes, and allies
Order: PasseriformesFamily: Vangidae

The helmetshrikes are similar in build to the shrikes, but tend to be colourful species with distinctive crests or other head ornaments, such as wattles, from which they get their name.

White helmetshrike, Prionops plumatusBushshrikes and allies
Order: PasseriformesFamily: Malaconotidae

Bushshrikes are similar in habits to shrikes, hunting insects and other small prey from a perch on a bush. Although similar in build to the shrikes, these tend to be either colourful species or largely black; some species are quite secretive.

Brubru, Nilaus aferNorthern puffback, Dryoscopus gambensisMarsh tchagra, Tchagra minutaBlack-crowned tchagra, Tchagra senegalaEthiopian boubou, Laniarius aethiopicusBlack-headed gonolek, Laniarius erythrogasterRosy-patched bushshrike, Rhodophoneus cruentusSulphur-breasted bushshrike, Telophorus sulfureopectusGray-headed bushshrike, Malaconotus blanchotiDrongos
Order: PasseriformesFamily: Dicruridae

The drongos are mostly black or dark grey in colour, sometimes with metallic tints. They have long forked tails, and some Asian species have elaborate tail decorations. They have short legs and sit very upright when perched, like a shrike. They flycatch or take prey from the ground.

Glossy-backed drongo, Dicrurus divaricatusShrikes
Order: PasseriformesFamily: Laniidae

Shrikes are passerine birds known for their habit of catching other birds and small animals and impaling the uneaten portions of their bodies on thorns. A typical shrike's beak is hooked, like a bird of prey.

Red-backed shrike, Lanius collurioRed-tailed shrike, Red-tailed shrikeIsabelline shrike, Lanius isabellinusGreat gray shrike, Lanius excubitorLesser gray shrike, Lanius minorGray-backed fiscal, Lanius excubitoroidesYellow-billed shrike, Lanius corvinusMasked shrike, Lanius nubicusWoodchat shrike, Lanius senatorCrows, jays, and magpies
Order: PasseriformesFamily: Corvidae

The family Corvidae includes crows, ravens, jays, choughs, magpies, treepies, nutcrackers and ground jays. Corvids are above average in size among the Passeriformes, and some of the larger species show high levels of intelligence.

Piapiac, Ptilostomus aferHouse crow, Corvus splendens (I)
Pied crow, Corvus albusBrown-necked raven, Corvus ruficollisFan-tailed raven, Corvus rhipidurusThick-billed raven, Corvus crassirostris (A)

Tits, chickadees, and titmice
Order: PasseriformesFamily: Paridae

The Paridae are mainly small stocky woodland species with short stout bills. Some have crests. They are adaptable birds, with a mixed diet including seeds and insects.

White-shouldered black-tit, Melaniparus guineensisWhite-winged black-tit, Melaniparus leucomelasDusky tit, Melaniparus funereus (A)

Penduline-tits
Order: PasseriformesFamily: Remizidae

The penduline-tits are a group of small passerine birds related to the true tits. They are insectivores.

Sennar penduline-tit, Anthoscopus punctifronsMouse-colored penduline-tit, Anthoscopus musculusLarks
Order: PasseriformesFamily: Alaudidae

Larks are small terrestrial birds with often extravagant songs and display flights. Most larks are fairly dull in appearance. Their food is insects and seeds.

Greater hoopoe-lark, Alaemon alaudipesRufous-rumped lark, Pinarocorys erythropygiaBar-tailed lark, Ammomanes cincturusDesert lark, Ammomanes desertiChestnut-backed sparrow-lark, Eremopterix leucotisBlack-crowned sparrow-lark, Eremopterix nigricepsRufous-naped lark, Mirafra africanaFlappet lark, Mirafra rufocinnamomeaKordofan lark, Mirafra cordofanica (A)
White-tailed lark, Mirafra albicaudaHorsfield’s bushlark, Mirafra javanicaRusty lark, Mirafra rufaGreater short-toed lark, Calandrella brachydactylaBimaculated lark, Melanocorypha bimaculataDunn's lark, Eremalauda dunniSun lark, Galerida modestaCrested lark, Galerida cristataAfrican warblers
Order: PasseriformesFamily: Macrosphenidae

African warblers are small to medium-sized insectivores which are found in a wide variety of habitats south of the Sahara.

Northern crombec, Sylvietta brachyuraCisticolas and allies
Order: PasseriformesFamily: Cisticolidae

The Cisticolidae are warblers found mainly in warmer southern regions of the Old World. They are generally very small birds of drab brown or grey appearance found in open country such as grassland or scrub.

Yellow-bellied eremomela, Eremomela icteropygialisGreen-backed eremomela, Eremomela canescensGreen-backed camaroptera, Camaroptera brachyuraCricket longtail, Spiloptila clamansBuff-bellied warbler, Phyllolais pulchellaGraceful prinia, Prinia gracilisTawny-flanked prinia, Prinia subflavaRed-fronted prinia, Prinia rufifronsRed-faced cisticola, Cisticola erythropsSinging cisticola, Cisticola cantansRock-loving cisticola, Cisticola aberransRed-pate cisticola, Cisticola ruficepsWinding cisticola, Cisticola marginatusFoxy cisticola, Cisticola troglodytesTiny cisticola, Cisticola nana (A)
Zitting cisticola, Cisticola juncidisDesert cisticola, Cisticola aridulusReed warblers and allies
Order: PasseriformesFamily: Acrocephalidae

The members of this family are usually rather large for "warblers". Most are rather plain olivaceous brown above with much yellow to beige below. They are usually found in open woodland, reedbeds, or tall grass. The family occurs mostly in southern to western Eurasia and surroundings, but it also ranges far into the Pacific, with some species in Africa.

Eastern olivaceous warbler, Iduna pallidaAfrican yellow-warbler, Iduna natalensis (A)
Upcher's warbler, Hippolais languida (A)
Olive-tree warbler, Hippolais olivetorumIcterine warbler, Hippolais icterinaSedge warbler, Acrocephalus schoenobaenusMarsh warbler, Acrocephalus palustrisCommon reed warbler, Acrocephalus scirpaceusBasra reed warbler, Acrocephalus griseldisLesser swamp warbler, Acrocephalus gracilirostrisGreat reed warbler, Acrocephalus arundinaceusClamorous reed warbler, Acrocephalus stentoreusGrassbirds and allies
Order: PasseriformesFamily: Locustellidae

Locustellidae are a family of small insectivorous songbirds found mainly in Eurasia, Africa, and the Australian region. They are smallish birds with tails that are usually long and pointed, and tend to be drab brownish or buffy all over.

River warbler, Locustella fluviatilisSavi's warbler, Locustella luscinioidesCommon grasshopper-warbler, Locustella naeviaSwallows
Order: PasseriformesFamily: Hirundinidae

The family Hirundinidae is adapted to aerial feeding. They have a slender streamlined body, long pointed wings and a short bill with a wide gape. The feet are adapted to perching rather than walking, and the front toes are partially joined at the base.

Plain martin, Riparia paludicolaBank swallow, Riparia ripariaEurasian crag-martin, Ptyonoprogne rupestrisRock martin, Ptyonoprogne fuligulaBarn swallow, Hirundo rusticaEthiopian swallow, Hirundo aethiopicaWire-tailed swallow, Hirundo smithiiRed-rumped swallow, Cecropis dauricaLesser striped swallow, Cecropis abyssinicaRufous-chested swallow, Cecropis semirufa (A)
Mosque swallow, Cecropis senegalensisRed Sea swallow, Petrochelidon perdita (A)
Common house-martin, Delichon urbicumGray-rumped swallow, Pseudhirundo griseopygaBulbuls
Order: PasseriformesFamily: Pycnonotidae

Bulbuls are medium-sized songbirds. Some are colourful with yellow, red or orange vents, cheeks, throats or supercilia, but most are drab, with uniform olive-brown to black plumage. Some species have distinct crests.

Northern brownbul, Phyllastrephus strepitansCommon bulbul, Pycnonotus barbatusLeaf warblers
Order: PasseriformesFamily: Phylloscopidae

Leaf warblers are a family of small insectivorous birds found mostly in Eurasia and ranging into Wallacea and Africa. The species are of various sizes, often green-plumaged above and yellow below, or more subdued with greyish-green to greyish-brown colours.

Wood warbler, Phylloscopus sibilatrixEastern Bonelli's warbler, Phylloscopus orientalisWillow warbler, Phylloscopus trochilusCommon chiffchaff, Phylloscopus collybitaSylviid warblers, parrotbills, and allies
Order: PasseriformesFamily: Sylviidae

The family Sylviidae is a group of small insectivorous passerine birds. They mainly occur as breeding species, as the common name implies, in Europe, Asia and, to a lesser extent, Africa. Most are of generally undistinguished appearance, but many have distinctive songs.

Eurasian blackcap, Sylvia atricapillaGarden warbler, Sylvia borinAfrican hill babbler, Sylvia abyssinicaBarred warbler, Curruca nisoriaLesser whitethroat, Curruca curruca'Arabian warbler, Curruca leucomelaenaEastern Orphean warbler, Curruca crassirostrisAsian desert warbler, Curruca nana'
Menetries's warbler, Curruca mystacea
Rüppell's warbler, Curruca ruppeli
Cyprus warbler, Curruca melanothorax
Sardinian warbler, Curruca melanocephala
Eastern subalpine warbler, Curruca cantillans
Greater whitethroat, Curruca communis

White-eyes, yuhinas, and allies
Order: PasseriformesFamily: Zosteropidae

The white-eyes are small and mostly undistinguished, their plumage above being generally some dull colour like greenish-olive, but some species have a white or bright yellow throat, breast or lower parts, and several have buff flanks. As their name suggests, many species have a white ring around each eye.

Abyssinian white-eye, Zosterops abyssinicus
Heuglin's white-eye, Zosterops poliogastrus
Northern yellow white-eye, Zosterops senegalensis

Laughingthrushes and allies
Order: PasseriformesFamily: Leiothrichidae

The laughingthrushes are somewhat diverse in size and colouration, but are characterised by soft fluffy plumage.

Fulvous chatterer, Argya fulva
Brown babbler, Turdoides plebejus
White-rumped babbler, Turdoides leucopygia
Cretzschmar's babbler, Turdoides leucocephala (A)

Oxpeckers
Order: PasseriformesFamily: Buphagidae

As both the English and scientific names of these birds imply, they feed on ectoparasites, primarily ticks, found on large mammals.

Red-billed oxpecker, Buphagus erythrorynchus
Yellow-billed oxpecker, Buphagus africanus

Starlings
Order: PasseriformesFamily: Sturnidae

Starlings are small to medium-sized passerine birds. Their flight is strong and direct and they are very gregarious. Their preferred habitat is fairly open country. They eat insects and fruit. Plumage is typically dark with a metallic sheen.

Wattled starling, Creatophora cinerea
Violet-backed starling, Cinnyricinclus leucogaster
Neumann's starling, Onychognathus neumanni
Rüppell's starling, Lamprotornis purpuroptera
Long-tailed glossy starling, Lamprotornis caudatus
Chestnut-bellied starling, Lamprotornis pulcher
Lesser blue-eared starling, Lamprotornis chloropterus
Greater blue-eared starling, Lamprotornis chalybaeus
Purple starling, Lamprotornis purpureus
Bronze-tailed starling, Lamprotornis chalcurus

Thrushes and allies
Order: PasseriformesFamily: Turdidae

The thrushes are a group of passerine birds that occur mainly in the Old World. They are plump, soft plumaged, small to medium-sized insectivores or sometimes omnivores, often feeding on the ground. Many have attractive songs.

Abyssinian ground-thrush, Geokichla piaggiae
Song thrush, Turdus philomelos
African thrush, Turdus pelios
Ring ouzel, Turdus torquatus (A)

Old World flycatchers
Order: PasseriformesFamily: Muscicapidae

Old World flycatchers are a large group of small passerine birds native to the Old World. They are mainly small arboreal insectivores. The appearance of these birds is highly varied, but they mostly have weak songs and harsh calls.

Spotted flycatcher, Muscicapa striata
Gambaga flycatcher, Muscicapa gambagae
Pale flycatcher, Agricola pallidus
Silverbird, Melaenornis semipartitus
Northern black-flycatcher, Melaenornis edolioides
Black scrub-robin, Cercotrichas podobe
Rufous-tailed scrub-robin, Cercotrichas galactotes
White-browed robin-chat, Cossypha heuglini
Red-capped robin-chat, Cossypha natalensis
Snowy-crowned robin-chat, Cossypha niveicapilla
White-throated robin, Irania gutturalis
Thrush nightingale, Luscinia luscinia
Common nightingale, Luscinia megarhynchos
Bluethroat, Luscinia svecica
Red-breasted flycatcher, Ficedula parva (A)
Semicollared flycatcher, Ficedula semitorquata
European pied flycatcher, Ficedula hypoleuca (A)
Collared flycatcher, Ficedula albicollis
Common redstart, Phoenicurus phoenicurus
Black redstart, Phoenicurus ochruros
Rufous-tailed rock-thrush, Monticola saxatilis
Blue rock-thrush, Monticola solitarius
Whinchat, Saxicola rubetra
Siberian stonechat, Saxicola maurus
African stonechat, Saxicola torquata
Mocking cliff-chat, Thamnolaea cinnamomeiventris
Northern anteater-chat, Myrmecocichla aethiops
Northern wheatear, Oenanthe oenanthe
Isabelline wheatear, Oenanthe isabellina
Heuglin's wheatear, Oenanthe heuglini
Hooded wheatear, Oenanthe monacha
Desert wheatear, Oenanthe deserti
Cyprus wheatear, Oenanthe cypriaca
Eastern black-eared wheatear, Oenanthe melanoleuca
Pied wheatear, Oenanthe pleschanka
Blackstart, Oenanthe melanura
Familiar chat, Oenanthe familiaris
Brown-tailed chat, Oenanthe scotocerca
White-crowned wheatear, Oenanthe leucopyga
Mourning wheatear, Oenanthe lugens (A)
Kurdish wheatear, Oenanthe xanthoprymna
Persian wheatear, Oenanthe chrysopygia

Hypocolius
Order: PasseriformesFamily: Hypocoliidae

The grey hypocolius is a small Middle Eastern bird with the shape and soft plumage of a waxwing. They are mainly a uniform grey colour except the males have a black triangular mask around their eyes.

Hypocolius, Hypocolius ampelinus (A)

Sunbirds and spiderhunters
Order: PasseriformesFamily: Nectariniidae

The sunbirds and spiderhunters are very small passerine birds which feed largely on nectar, although they will also take insects, especially when feeding young. Flight is fast and direct on their short wings. Most species can take nectar by hovering like a hummingbird, but usually perch to feed.

Pygmy sunbird, Hedydipna platura
Nile Valley sunbird, Hedydipna metallica
Scarlet-chested sunbird, Chalcomitra senegalensis
Beautiful sunbird, Cinnyris pulchellus
Palestine sunbird, Cinnyris oseus
Shining sunbird, Cinnyris habessinicus
Variable sunbird, Cinnyris venustus
Copper sunbird, Cinnyris cupreus

Weavers and allies
Order: PasseriformesFamily: Ploceidae

The weavers are small passerine birds related to the finches. They are seed-eating birds with rounded conical bills. The males of many species are brightly coloured, usually in red or yellow and black, some species show variation in colour only in the breeding season.

White-billed buffalo-weaver, Bubalornis albirostris
Speckle-fronted weaver, Sporopipes frontalis
Chestnut-crowned sparrow-weaver, Plocepasser superciliosus
Gray-headed social-weaver, Pseudonigrita arnaudi (A)
Red-headed weaver, Anaplectes rubriceps
Baglafecht weaver, Ploceus baglafecht
Little weaver, Ploceus luteolus
Northern masked-weaver, Ploceus taeniopterus
Vitelline masked-weaver, Ploceus vitellinus
Rüppell's weaver, Ploceus galbula
Village weaver, Ploceus cucullatus
Black-headed weaver, Ploceus melanocephalus (A)
Chestnut weaver, Ploceus rubiginosus
Cinnamon weaver, Ploceus badius (E)
Red-billed quelea, Quelea quelea
Northern red bishop, Euplectes franciscanus
Black-winged bishop, Euplectes hordeaceus
Yellow-crowned bishop, Euplectes afer
White-winged widowbird, Euplectes albonotatus
Red-cowled widowbird, Euplectes laticauda
Yellow-mantled widowbird, Euplectes macroura
Fan-tailed widowbird, Euplectes axillaris

Waxbills and allies
Order: PasseriformesFamily: Estrildidae

The estrildid finches are small passerine birds of the Old World tropics and Australasia. They are gregarious and often colonial seed eaters with short thick but pointed bills. They are all similar in structure and habits, but have wide variation in plumage colours and patterns.

Bronze mannikin, Spermestes cucullata
African silverbill, Euodice cantans
Fawn-breasted waxbill, Estrilda paludicola
Black-rumped waxbill, Estrilda troglodytes
Crimson-rumped waxbill, Estrilda rhodopyga
Quailfinch, Ortygospiza atricollis (A)
Cut-throat, Amadina fasciata
Zebra waxbill, Amandava subflava
Red-cheeked cordonbleu, Uraeginthus bengalus
Green-winged pytilia, Pytilia melba
Red-billed pytilia, Pytilia lineata (A)
Red-billed firefinch, Lagonosticta senegala
Bar-breasted firefinch, Lagonosticta rufopicta
Black-faced firefinch, Lagonosticta larvata

Indigobirds
Order: PasseriformesFamily: Viduidae

The indigobirds are finch-like species which usually have black or indigo predominating in their plumage. All are brood parasites, which lay their eggs in the nests of estrildid finches.

Pin-tailed whydah, Vidua macroura
Sahel paradise-whydah, Vidua orientalis
Eastern paradise-whydah, Vidua paradisaea
Village indigobird, Vidua chalybeata
Quailfinch indigobird, Vidua nigeriae (A)
Baka indigobird, Vidua larvaticola

Old World sparrows
Order: PasseriformesFamily: Passeridae

Old World sparrows are small passerine birds. In general, sparrows tend to be small, plump, brown or grey birds with short tails and short powerful beaks. Sparrows are seed eaters, but they also consume small insects.

House sparrow, Passer domesticus
Spanish sparrow, Passer hispaniolensis
Kordofan rufous sparrow, Passer cordofanicus (E)
Northern gray-headed sparrow, Passer griseus
Swainson's sparrow, Passer swainsonii
Desert sparrow, Passer simplex
Sudan golden sparrow, Passer luteus
Chestnut sparrow, Passer eminibey
Yellow-spotted bush sparrow, Gymnoris pyrgita
Sahel bush sparrow, Gymnoris dentata
Pale rockfinch, Carpospiza brachydactyla

Wagtails and pipits
Order: PasseriformesFamily: Motacillidae

Motacillidae is a family of small passerine birds with medium to long tails. They include the wagtails, longclaws and pipits. They are slender, ground feeding insectivores of open country.

Gray wagtail, Motacilla cinerea
Western yellow wagtail, Motacilla flava
African pied wagtail, Motacilla aguimp
White wagtail, Motacilla alba
African pipit, Anthus cinnamomeus
Long-billed pipit, Anthus similis
Tawny pipit, Anthus campestris
Plain-backed pipit, Anthus leucophrys
Tree pipit, Anthus trivialis
Red-throated pipit, Anthus cervinus

Finches, euphonias, and allies
Order: PasseriformesFamily: Fringillidae

Finches are seed-eating passerine birds, that are small to moderately large and have a strong beak, usually conical and in some species very large. All have twelve tail feathers and nine primaries. These birds have a bouncing flight with alternating bouts of flapping and gliding on closed wings, and most sing well.

Trumpeter finch, Bucanetes githaginea
White-rumped seedeater, Crithagra leucopygius
Yellow-fronted canary, Crithagra mozambicus
Yellow-rumped serin, Crithagra xanthopygia
Reichard's seedeater, Crithagra reichardi
Eurasian linnet, Linaria cannabina (A)

Old World buntings
Order: PasseriformesFamily: Emberizidae

The emberizids are a large family of passerine birds. They are seed-eating birds with distinctively shaped bills. Many emberizid species have distinctive head patterns.

Rock bunting, Emberiza cia (A)
Cinereous bunting, Emberiza cineracea
Ortolan bunting, Emberiza hortulana
Cretzschmar's bunting, Emberiza caesia
Golden-breasted bunting, Emberiza flaviventris
Cinnamon-breasted bunting, Emberiza tahapisi
Gosling's bunting, Emberiza goslingi
Striolated bunting, Emberiza striolata

See also
List of birds
Lists of birds by region

References

External links
Birds of Sudan - World Institute for Conservation and Environment

Sudan
Sudan
Birds
Sudan